Don José Manterola Beldarrain (1849–1884), born in San Sebastián, Gipuzkoa, Spain, was a Basque writer who founded one of the most influential movements for cultivating the Basque language. As a member of the Navarrese movement, he was best known for founding the bilingual magazine Euskal-Erria (meaning the country of the Basques) in 1880, and editing it until 1884. Between 1877 and 1880 he published a three volume collection of Basque songs, Cancionero Vasco, complete with biographical, bibliographical, and critical notes. They are generally regarded as being the first anthology of Basque poetry.

References 
  Biography of José Manterola
  José Manterola (euskaraz.net)
  Jose Manterola literaturaren zubitegian

Basque culture
Basque-language scholars
People from San Sebastián
1849 births
1884 deaths
Basque-language poets